The 1967 Paris–Roubaix was the 65th edition of the Paris–Roubaix cycle race and was held on 9 April 1967. The race started in Compiègne and finished in Roubaix. The race was won by Jan Janssen of the Pelforth team.

General classification

References

Paris–Roubaix
Paris-Roubaix
Paris-Roubaix
Paris-Roubaix
Paris-Roubaix